= Busch 200 =

There have been three NASCAR Busch Series races named Busch 200:

- Busch 200 (South Boston), run at South Boston Speedway from 1982 to 1989
- Busch 200 (Langley), run at Langley Field Speedway from 1984 to 1988
- Busch 200 (New Hampshire), run at New Hampshire International Speedway in 1999, 2000, and 2002
